"A calorie is a calorie" is a tautology used to convey the thermodynamic concept that a "calorie" is a sufficient way to describe the energy content of food.

History 
In 1878, German nutritionist Max Rubner crafted what he called the "isodynamic law". The law claims that the basis of nutrition is the exchange of energy, and was applied to the study of obesity in the early 1900s by Carl von Noorden. Von Noorden had two theories about what caused people to develop obesity. The first simply avowed Rubner's notion that "a calorie is a calorie". The second theorized that obesity development depends on how the body partitions calories for either use or storage. Since 1925, the calorie has been defined in terms of the joule; the current definition of the calorie was formally adopted in 1948.

The related concept of "calorie in, calorie out" is contested by some, despite having become a commonly held and frequently referenced belief in nutritionism.

Calorie counting 
Calorie amounts found on food labels are based on the Atwater system. The accuracy of the system is disputed, despite no real proposed alternatives. For example, a 2012 study by a USDA scientist concluded that the measured energy content of a sample of almonds was 32% lower than the estimated Atwater value. The driving mechanism behind caloric intake is absorption, which occurs largely in the small intestine and distributes nutrients to the circulatory and lymphatic capillaries by means of osmosis, diffusion and active transport. Fat, in particular is emulsified by bile produced by the liver and stored in the gallbladder where it is released to the small intestine via the bile duct. A relatively lesser amount of absorption—composed primarily of water—occurs in the large intestine.

A kilocalorie is the equivalent of 1000 calories or one dietary Calorie, which contains 4184 joules of energy. The human body is a highly complex biochemical system that undergoes processes which regulate energy balance. The metabolic pathways for protein are less efficient than the metabolic pathways for carbohydrates and fat. Protein contains four calories per gram, although a large part of the calories are lost as heat when metabolised by the body.

See also 
 Basal metabolic rate
 Dieting
 Empty calorie
 Management of obesity
 Metabolism
 Physical exercise
 Scientific control
 Sleep and metabolism

References

Nutrition
Diets
Food science